Stick season is a term used in Vermont for the transition between fall and winter, after the leaves have fallen and before snow has settled on the trees.

References

American slang
Vermont culture
Environment of Vermont